Kumariya is a city located in Gashua, Yobe State, Nigeria.

Populated places in Yobe State